Árpád Toma (born 3 January 1958) is a former Hungarian professional footballer who played as a defender, later became a football coach. He was a member of the Hungarian national football team.

Career 
He started playing football at the Pécs Sports School in 1972. In 1977 he made his debut in the top flight for Pécsi MFC. In the 1985-86 season he won the silver medal with the team. Until 1989 he played in 351 league matches and scored 9 goals. After that he played one season for Komlói Bányász SK, before moving to Kemi City F.C. in Finland, from where he returned to Komlói Bányasz SK. In 1992 he played for the German team SV Sallern.

National team 
In 1987 he played five times for the Hungarian national team.

As a coach 
On 18 September 2000, he was appointed head coach of the Pécsi MFC senior team. Later he worked for the youth teams of Pécsi. In 2010 he coached Sellye.

Achievements 

 Nemzeti Bajnokság I (NB I)
 Second: 1985-86
 Magyar Kupa (MNK)
 Finalist: 1987

References 

1958 births
Living people
Hungarian footballers

Nemzeti Bajnokság I players

Hungary international footballers
People from Pécs
Association football defenders
Hungarian football managers
Pécsi MFC players
Komlói Bányász SK footballers
Kemi City F.C. players
Pécsi MFC managers